Dance Kids is a Filipino reality dance competition show on ABS-CBN. It premiered on November 14, 2015 replacing Pinoy Big Brother: 737 and was shown twice a week every Saturday and Sunday evenings. It was broadcast internationally by The Filipino Channel. It ended on February 7, 2016 announcing the Filipino-Canadian duo Lucky Aces as the grand champion and was replaced by I Love OPM. It is hosted by Robi Domingo and Alex Gonzaga.

Hosts
 Robi Domingo
 Alex Gonzaga

Judges
The judges, dubbed as "Dance Masters" of the show:

 Vhong Navarro 'King Of The Dance Floor'
 Georcelle Dapat-Sy of G-Force
 Andy Alviz

The Try Outs
In the first phase of the competition named as the "Try Outs", kids will perform in front of the judges known as the "Dance Masters." Performers can come in as a solo act, duo, or as a group.

The acts should be able to impress the Dance Masters at the end of their performance. If a Dance Master is impressed, he/she should stomp on the Stomp Pad. In the event that they get three (3) stomps from the Dance Masters within their performance, the act will automatically make it to next phase of the competition.

However, if the act could not complete all three stomps at the end of their performance, it won't be the end just yet. The Dance Master/s who initially stomped for the act, will have the opportunity to convince their co-Dance Masters to give the acts a chance. If one further declines, then the competition ends for the aspiring dancer or dance group.
 
The Dance Masters are only allowed to give their unanimous votes 32 times, for the 32 acts who will compete on the next level.

The Dance Offs
The "Dance Off" is the second level of the competition where two acts who made it from the "Try-outs", are chosen to dance against each other. The "Dance Masters" will then chose who among the two acts better by stomping the stomp pad. The act who gets the most stomp will be the one who will go to the "Step Up", the next level of the competition.

The Step Ups
Acts who made it into the "Step Ups" will go to the Quarter Finals, then Semi-finals and ultimately to the grand finals.

Quarter, Semi and Grand Finals

Grand Champion's prizes
The grand champion Lucky Aces, has received ₱2,000,000 cash, a house and lot, a family vacation, ₱300,000 worth of shopping spree, and a management contract from Star Magic.

References

External links
 Dance Kids main page
 About Dance Kids

ABS-CBN original programming
Philippine reality television series
2015 Philippine television series debuts
2016 Philippine television series endings
Filipino-language television shows